The 2014 The National in November was held from November 19 to 23 at the Essar Centre in Sault Ste. Marie, Ontario as part of the 2014–15 World Curling Tour. The National was the second men's Grand Slam event of the season.

Teams
The teams are listed as follows:

Round-robin standings
Final round-robin standings

Round-robin results
The draw is listed as follows:

Draw 1
Wednesday, November 19, 7:00 pm

Draw 2
Thursday, November 20, 9:00 am

Draw 3
Thursday, November 20, 12:30 pm

Draw 4
Thursday, November 20, 4:00 pm

Draw 5
Thursday, November 20, 7:30 pm

Draw 6
Friday, November 21, 9:00 am

Draw 7
Friday, November 21, 12:00 pm

Draw 8
Friday, November 21, 3:30 pm

Draw 9
Friday, November 21, 7:30 pm

Playoffs

Quarterfinals
Saturday, November 22, 12:00 pm

Semifinals
Saturday, November 22, 3:30 pm

Final
Sunday, November 23, 3:30 pm

References

External links

National
National
Curling in Northern Ontario
The National (curling)
Sport in Sault Ste. Marie, Ontario
National